Navalgadh is a village in the Surendranagar District of the State of Gujarat in India. Navalgadh is surrounded by the Lakhtar, Surendranagar, Wadhwan and Muli talukas.

References 

Villages in Surendranagar district